The 2014 ATS Formel 3 Cup was the 12th and final edition of the ATS F3 Cup. The final season began on 26 April at Oschersleben and finished on 5 October at Hockenheim after eight race weekends with three races scheduled for each weekend. However, one race was cancelled due to fog, and thus the championship was held over a total of 23 races.

Category veteran Markus Pommer finished the season as the champion, after comfortably winning the most races during the season. Pommer won 14 races for the Motopark Academy-run Lotus team – for a total of 17 podiums – as well as taking 11 pole positions and 10 fastest laps. He finished almost 150 points clear of his nearest rival Nabil Jeffri, who was run by Motopark Academy without Lotus backing. Jeffri won a pair of races at Oschersleben and the first Hockenheim meeting, with his season revolving around consistency, with no fewer than 10 runner-up finishes and 15 podium finishes in total. Jeffri finished 11 points clear of another Lotus driver, Indy Dontje, who was a race winner at the Red Bull Ring, and was the highest finishing rookie in the championship. Dontje was also the winner of the concurrent rookie championship by 45 points.

Three other drivers won races during the season; Van Amersfoort Racing duo Sam MacLeod (three wins) and Weiron Tan (two wins) were joined in victory by Nicolai Sylvest, who won at the Nürburgring for JBR Motorsport & Engineering. With 15 total wins, Lotus were the winners of the teams' championship, 113 points clear of the next best team, Van Amersfoort Racing.

Teams and drivers

Race calendar and results
The championship was a part of the ADAC Masters weekend at six of the season's eight rounds; additional rounds were held at the Stuttgarter Rössle meeting at Hockenheim in June and a round in support of the Deutsche Tourenwagen Masters at Lausitzring in September. All races were held in Germany, excepting Red Bull Ring round at Austria.

Championship standings

Cup
 Points were awarded as follows:

† — Drivers did not finish the race, but were classified as they completed over 90% of the race distance.

Rookie

† — Drivers did not finish the race, but were classified as they completed over 90% of the race distance.

Team

† — Drivers did not finish the race, but were classified as they completed over 90% of the race distance.

References

External links
 

German Formula Three Championship seasons
German Formula Three
German
German Formula 3 Championship